Cayratia debilis is a species of flowering plant in the Vitaceae family. It is native to equatorial Africa. It has herbaceous or slightly woody vines, with 5-foliate leaves and greenish-white or yellow flowers. Its stem, leaves and sap are used in herbal medicine in various African countries, and the leaves are eaten as a vegetable on the island of Bioko. Its fruits are inedible, although are fed to poultry in the Central African Republic to protect from influenza and coccidiosis.

References

External links
 

Plants used in traditional African medicine
debilis
Taxa named by John Gilbert Baker
Taxa named by Karl Suessenguth